The Hero of Women (Spanish: El héroe de las mujeres) is a book by Argentine writer Adolfo Bioy Casares published in 1978. It is a collection of short stories and includes a work with that same name.

Contents 
"De la forma del mundo"
"Otra esperanza"
"Una guerra perdida"
"Lo desconocido atrae a la juventud"
"La pasajera de primera clase"
"El jardin de los sueños"
"Una puerta se abre"
"El héroe de las mujeres"

Argentine short story collections
1978 short story collections